Wini or WINI can refer to:
Wini, Indonesia, a village in Indonesia with a border crossing to East Timor
Wine (bishop), a medieval Bishop of London
WINI, an American radio station
Wini Wini, a mountain in Peru

See also 
Winnie (disambiguation)